Trestonia fasciata is a species of beetle in the family Cerambycidae. It was described by Martins and Galileo in 1990. It is known from Colombia.

References

fasciata
Beetles described in 1990